This is a list of all 52 episodes of 3000 Leagues in Search of Mother, an anime television series produced by Nippon Animation. The series aired in Japan between January 4, 1976 and December 26, 1976.

Episodes

References

3000 Leagues in Search of Mother